The Prince is a 2019 Chilean drama film directed by Sebastián Muñoz, and co-written by Muñoz and Luis Barrales, based on an obscure 1970s novel written by Mario Cruz. Set around 1970 in a prison cell in San Bernardo, Chile, just prior to Salvador Allende's presidency, The Prince is a dark story about affections and loyalties between prisoners, the search for sexual identity, love, violence and the rise to power behind bars.

The film made its world premiere was in the Critic’s Week section at Venice International Film Festival 2019, winning the prestigious Queer Lion Prize.
The Prince was also selected to compete in San Sebastian International Film Festival, 2019 at the Horizontes Latinos section.

Plot
Set in a Santiago prison in 1970, the film portrays Jaime, a young prisoner convicted of the violent and inexplicable murder of his best friend. He has a definitive encounter with "The Stallion," an older and powerful inmate who commands respect among the prisoners. Seeking protection, Jaime develops a relationship of affection and tenderness with the man, discovering love and the need for recognition. Later, as "The Prince," he rethinks his sexual identity and the reason for his incarceration.

Cast
 Alfredo Castro as "The Stallion"
 Juan Carlos Maldonado as Jaime/"The Prince"
 Gastón Pauls as "Che Pibe"
 Sebastián Ayala as "The Abandoned"
 Lux Pascal as Dany/"The Rucio"
 Cesare Serra as "The Gypsy"
 José Antonio Raffo as López
 Paola Volpato as Elena
 Catalina Martin as Mónica
 Jaime Leiva as Miguel
 Nicolás Zárate as Julio
 Paula Zúñiga as the Stallion's woman
 Óscar Hernández as Prince's father
 Carlos Corales as Don Roberto
 Daniel Antivilo as El Tropical

Production
The film is based the sole novel by little-known author Mario Cruz, which was cherished many years ago by filmmaker Alicia Scherson, who was in talks with playwright Luis Barrales to prepare the script. Cruz's homoerotic novel has its heyday in the 70s, it was never available in bookstores and could only be acquired in the newsstands of San Diego Street, in Santiago, becoming a cult novel. Director Sebastián Muñoz found it by chance and, along with Barrales himself, refined the script to its final form.

Subsequently, the Chilean production team Niña Niño Films and El Otro Films, alongside the Argentine company Le Tiro Cine and the Belgian Be Revolution Pictures, joined the project. The cast was completed with veteran actors Alfredo Castro and Gastón Pauls, and young actors Juan Carlos Maldonado, Sebastián Ayala and Lux Pascal.

Reception
At Venice, much of the Italian specialty press evaluated the film positively. Martina Barone at Cinematographe wrote: "a film of impetuous sensuality. A disturbing film, in its multifaceted sexual, emotional and primitive ferocity", Samuele Sestieri at PointBlank wrote: "The first work by Chilean filmmaker Sebastián Muñoz is a dazzling song of love and death, between pleasure and pain", Carlo Valeri at Sentieriselvaggi wrote: "A claustrophobic film, but at the same time full of desiring impulses. Asphyxiating and passionate as a last hug before saying goodbye". At the end of the festival, the film was awarded the Queer Lion:

After Venice and positive reviews in Europe, the first American evaluation came from Boyd van Hoeij of The Hollywood Reporter (and a former Queer Lion juror himself), who negatively received the film; the bottom line being: "A prison fantasy devoid of personality."

On review aggregation website Rotten Tomatoes, The Prince holds a 94% approval rating based on 16 reviews, with an average of 7.7/10.

Film festivals
Following its Venice premiere, The Prince saw exhibition at various other festivals, including San Sebastián, Chicago, Mill Valley, Busan and Valdivia.

References

External links
 
  The Prince, official international Trailer

2019 films
Chilean drama films
Films set in Chile
Films shot in Chile
Chilean LGBT-related films
LGBT-related drama films
2019 LGBT-related films
2010s Spanish-language films
2010s Chilean films